Lepidotarsa habrodelta is a moth of the family Oecophoridae. It is found in New South Wales, South Australia and Victoria. This moth has white forewings each with a black stripe across the base, a dark brown margin, and an often incomplete brown or yellow 'X' across the middle of the wing The hindwings are off-white shading to brown at the margins. The wingspan is about 2 cm.

References

External links
Australian Faunal Directory

Oecophoridae